The North China University of Water Resources and Electric Power (NCWU) is a public university in Zhengzhou, Henan, China. The university is founded in 1951 and now co-funded by the Ministry of Water Resources and the Henan Provincial People's Government. 

NCWU is a full-time public university specializing in the field of water resources and hydropower, with engineering as a key program. Multidisciplinary subjects are developing constantly and in coordination with one another, including science, agriculture, economics, management, art, and law.

NCWU is ranked as “excellent” in the Evaluation on Undergraduate Teaching Level conducted by the Ministry of Education. It is also the backbone university enjoying priority support from Henan Province. NCWU mainly recruits full-time undergraduate and graduate students together with a small number of three-year diploma students.

History 
NCWU was founded in 1951 in Beijing as the Water Conservancy School of the Ministry of Water Resources of the Central People's Government. In 1954, it was renamed the Beijing Water Conservancy School of the Ministry of Water Resources. In 1958, the Beijing Hydropower School and the Beijing Hydropower Correspondence College were merged to form the Beijing Water Conservancy and Hydropower College. In 1969, the university moved to Yuecheng Reservoir, Cixian County, Hebei Province. In 1971, the university was renamed Hebei Water Conservancy and Hydropower College. In 1977, the university was relocated to Bengbu, Hebei, and in 1978 was renamed as the North China Institute of Water Resources and Hydropower. In 1990, the university was moved for a third time to its current location in Zhengzhou, Henan. In 2000, the whole system was transferred to Henan Province by the Ministry of Water Resources. In 2009, the Ministry of Water Resources and the Henan Provincial Government signed a strategic agreement to jointly build the North China Institute of Water Resources and Hydropower. In 2013, it was renamed the North China University of Water Resources and Hydropower.

Campus 
The North China University of Water Resources and Electric Power is located in Zhengzhou, Henan near the Yellow River, which is called the mother river of China. The total area of the campus is about 2340 mu (156 ha).

Academic Profile 
NCWU has over 12,000 full-time students including postgraduates, undergraduates, and three-year program students. NCWU offers 64 undergraduate majors, 14 provincial-level key disciplines, 3 doctoral degree-granting first-level disciplines, 19 doctoral degree-granting second-level disciplines, 19 master's degree-granting first-level disciplines, 10 professional master's degree categories, and 17 master's degree programs. Water Conservancy and Hydroelectric Power Engineering, Hydraulic Structures Engineering, Hydraulics and Fluvial Power Engineering, Hydrology and Water Resources, and Geological Engineering have been identified by both Henan Province and the Water Conservancy Ministry as key subjects. The Hydraulic Structures Laboratory and Material Construction Laboratory are also key laboratories of both Henan Province and the Water Conservancy Ministry. In addition, the university has been qualified to enroll overseas students since 1958. This lapsed for the reason of our university's move. The university started to enroll overseas students in 2004. NCWU has been qualified to give a separate examination for postgraduate students and to recommend and receive undergraduate students who apply for the master's degree program without completing examinations. The university also holds the right to accept applications for the postgraduate program from candidates with an equivalent education level.

Notable alumni
 E Jingping (born 1956), engineer and politician, Minister of Water Resources of China
 Li Guoying, engineer and politician, Governor of Anhui Province
Liu Cixin, Hugo Award winner, nine-time Galaxy Award winner

References

External links
  Official website of the University
  English homepage of the University

Universities and colleges in Zhengzhou
Educational institutions established in 1951
1951 establishments in China